Platydoris galbana is a species of sea slug, a dorid nudibranch, shell-less marine opisthobranch gastropod mollusks in the family Discodorididae.

Distribution
This species was described from Phillip Island, Victoria, Australia. It has been reported from New South Wales.

References

Discodorididae
Gastropods described in 1958